Freeman Academy is a private, Christian elementary school and high school in Freeman, South Dakota, that serves students in grades K-12. The school was founded in 1901 as a junior college, but now functions as only a grade, middle, and high school. The junior college closed in 1986.

The school is affiliated with Mennonite Church, but welcomes students of all denominations. It serves the greater Freeman community primarily, but those enrolled hail from neighboring communities and states, as well. Traditionally, the school also welcomes foreign exchange students, giving Freeman Academy a multi-cultural dimension each school year. School enrollment generally falls between 70 and 80 students. Boarding is available for students wishing to attend from a distance.

The school distinguishes itself through a curriculum that focuses on "Faith and the Arts" with a student-to-teacher ratio far smaller than traditional public high schools.

Freeman Academy athletics features cross country, football, soccer, volleyball, basketball, track, and golf; its mascot is the Bearcat.

Elementary classroom teaching replicates the "one room schoolhouse" concept. Students enrolled in grades K-6 receive hands-on, project-based learning.

See also
Larry Miller (athlete)

References

External links
Official website
 Freeman Junior College (Freeman, South Dakota, USA) at Global Anabaptist Mennonite Encyclopedia Online

Mennonite schools in the United States
Schools in Hutchinson County, South Dakota
Private middle schools in South Dakota
Private high schools in South Dakota
Private K-12 schools in the United States
Boarding schools in South Dakota
Mennonitism in South Dakota
Christian schools in South Dakota